the Chicago mayoral election of 1850, Democrat James Curtiss defeated Levi Boone and Lewis C. Kerchival by a double-digit margin.

The incumbent mayor James H. Woodworth did not run for a third term.

Curtiss had previously served one term as mayor, having previously been elected in 1847. This was Curtiss' fourth mayoral campaign, as he also ran unsuccessful campaigns in 1839 and 1848.

Kerchival had also been an unsuccessful candidate in the previous election.

Results

References

Mayoral elections in Chicago
Chicago
Chicago
1850s in Chicago